Didi Petet (July 12, 1956 – May 15, 2015), born Didi Widiatmoko, was an Indonesian actor and film director best known for starring as Emon in the Catatan Si Boy series of films in the late 1980s and early 1990s.

Death 
Didi Petet died on May 15, 2015, at approximately 03:00. His death was caused by Stomach acid after he carry out Tahajjud prayer.

Filmography
Catatan Si Boy (1987) ... Emon
Catatan Si Boy 2 (1988) ... Emon
Bayar Tapi Nyicil (1988) ... Emon
Pacar Ketinggalan Kereta (1989)
Joe Turun ke Desa (1989) ... Joe
Rebo & Robby (1990)
Catatan Si Boy 3 (1990) ... Emon
Si Kabayan dan Anak Jin (1991)
Gema Kampus 66 (1991)
Catatan Si Emon (1991) ... Emon
Catatan Si Boy 5 (1991) ... Emon
Asmara (1992)
Si Kabayan Mencari Jodoh (1994) ... Kabayan
Petualangan Sherina (2000) ... Ardiwilaga
Pasir Berbisik (2001) ... Suwito
Eiffel I'm in Love (2003)
Rindu Kami Padamu (2004) ... Pak Guru
Tentang Dia (2005) ... Pak Dibyo
Banyu Biru (2005) ... Wahyu
Apa Artinya Cinta (2005) ... Om Sudiro
D'Girlz Begins (2006)
Kamulah Satu-Satunya (2007)
Di Bawah Lindungan Ka'bah (2011)
Preman Pensiun (2015) - RCTI

Awards and nominations

References

External links 

1956 births
2015 deaths
Male actors from East Java
Indonesian male film actors
Javanese people
People from Surabaya